Events from the year 2005 in the European Union.

Incumbents
 Commission President
 José Manuel Barroso
 Council Presidency
 Luxembourg (January–June)
 The United Kingdom (July–December)
 Parliament President
 Josep Borrell
 High Representative
 Javier Solana

Events

January
 1 January: Luxembourg takes the Presidency of the Council of the European Union.
 26 January: The Commission's strategic objectives outlined as: "Prosperity, Solidarity and Security."

February
 1 February – European Constitution: The lower chamber of the Slovenian Parliament, the National Assembly ratifies a European Union constitution proposal, with 79 votes to 4. Thus, Slovenia becomes the third European Union state to ratify it.
 16 February: The Kyoto protocol enters into force.
 20 February – European Constitution: Spain approves a European Constitution proposal by referendum.

April
 6 April – European Constitution: The upper house of the Italian Parliament ratifies the European Constitution proposal with 217 votes to 16, after its lower house approved the proposal in January.
19 April – European Constitution: The Hellenic Parliament ratifies the European Constitution proposal with 268 votes in favour, 17 against and 15 abstentions. Greece becomes the sixth member state of the European Union to approve the constitution proposal.

May
 26 May – European Constitution: France rejects a European Constitution proposal by referendum.

June
 1 June – European Constitution: The Netherlands rejects a European Constitution proposal by referendum. The referendum was consultative, and was not legally binding.

July
 1 July: The United Kingdom takes the Presidency.
 7 July: Terrorist attack in London
 10 July – European Constitution: Luxembourg approves a European Constitution proposition by referendum.

September
 30 September: Jyllands-Posten publishes a series of cartoons which were found insulting by Muslim groups triggering protests and attacks against Europe such as the storming of a Commission office.

October
 3 October: Accession negotiations start with Croatia and Turkey.

December
 18 December: WTO talks in Hong Kong fail to conclude the Doha Development Agenda.

References

 
Years of the 21st century in the European Union
2000s in the European Union